The 2003/04 season of the Bonearian football League played in Bonaire, Netherlands Antilles started on September 7, 2003 and the final was played on June 25, 2004.

The championship was played over 3 phases. First phase with all 7 teams, followed by a playoff with the top 4 teams and then a final with the 2 top teams. For the first times Real Rincon and Vespo were allowed to play each team once at home in the Antonio Trenidat Stadium. All remaining matches were played at Stadion Playa at Kralendijk. Defending champions Real Rincon successfully defended their titles by defeating SV Estrellas in the final 1-0.

Regular season 
Teams face each other 2 times. Top four teams qualify for the semifinal playoffs

Standing

Playoffs 
Teams face each other 2 times. Top two teams qualify for the final.

Standing

Final 
1st leg

2nd leg

External links 
  RSSSF
  Extra

Bonaire League seasons
football
football